Maertens is a surname. Notable people with the surname include:

Bert Maertens (born 1981), Belgian politician
Birger Maertens (born 1980), Belgian footballer
Bob Maertens (1930–2003), Belgian footballer and manager
Erhard Maertens (1891–1945), German Vizeadmiral of the Kriegsmarine
Filip Maertens (born 1978), Belgian businessman
Freddy Maertens (born 1952), Belgian cyclist
Grégoire Maertens (born 1924), Belgian Esperantist
Mathieu Maertens (born 1995), Belgian footballer
Rémy Maertens, Belgian tug of war competitor
Willy Maertens (1893–1967), German actor

Dutch-language surnames